"Flight 643" is a single which appeared in DJ Tiësto's first album, In My Memory. In 2001 it was included as a B-side of "Urban Train", later released as an A-Side single; In 2006 it became B-side of "Lethal Industry" as a remix by Richard Durand. The song had great success that it was adapted with vocals by Suzanne Palmer in 2002, it was also released as a single and titled "643 (Love's on Fire)". The name Flight 643 is derived from KLM Royal Dutch Airlines flight number KL643, which is a non-stop service between Amsterdam and New York JFK. The big room house DJ John Christian made a rework of the track in October 2013 and got his version released on Tiësto's new label, Musical Freedom. It's featured in the soundtrack for the 2001 videogame FIFA Football 2002.

Formats and track listings

CD, Maxi Singles
Netherlands, Scandinavia Maxi Single
 "Flight 643" (Radio Edit)–2:53
 "Flight 643" (Original Mix)–9:05
 "Flight 643" (Jaimy & Kenny D Remix) - 7:38
 "Flight 643" (Oliver Klein Remix) - 9:27
 "Flight 643" (Orkidea's Wintergalactic Mix) - 9:11

Netherlands Maxi Single
 "Flight 643" (Original Mix)–9:05
 "Flight 643" (Jaimy & Kenny D Remix) - 7:43
 "Flight 643" (Oliver Klein Remix) - 9:29
 "Flight 643" (Orkidea's Wintergalactic Mix) - 9:27

United Kingdom Maxi Single
 "Flight 643" (Original Mix)–6:29
 "Flight 643" (Oliver Klein Remix) - 6:42
 "Flight 643" (Jaimy & Kenny D Remix) - 6:37

12" Vinyl

Magik Muzik 12" Vinyl
 "Flight 643" (Radio Edit)–2:53
 "Flight 643" –9:05

Nebula 12" Vinyl
 "Flight 643" (Jaimy & Kenny D Remix) - 7:38
 "Flight 643" (Orkidea's Wintergalactic Mix) - 9:11

Nebula, Nettwerk America, Independence Records, Universal Licensing Music (ULM) 12" Vinyl
 "Flight 643" (Original Mix)–9:07
 "Flight 643" (Oliver Klein Remix) - 9:27

Nettwerk America 12" Vinyl
 "Flight 643" (Original Mix)–9:07
 "Flight 643" (Orkidea's Wintergalactic Mix) - 9:12

Nettwerk America 12" Vinyl
 "Flight 643" (Original Mix)–9:07
 "Flight 643" (Orkidea's Wintergalactic Mix) - 9:12
 "Flight 643" (Oliver Klein Remix) - 9:27
 "Flight 643" (Jaimy & Kenny D Remix) - 7:50

Richard Durand Remixes
 "Lethal Industry" (Richard Durand Remix) - 8:48
 "Flight 643" (Richard Durand Remix) - 9:17

Urban Train/Flight 643

Dos Or Die Recordings 12" Vinyl
 "Suburban Train" (Original Mix) - 9:20
 "Flight 643" (Original Mix) - 9:04

Dos Or Die Recordings 12" Vinyl
 "Suburban Train" (Marc O'Tool Main Remix)
 "Flight 643" (Oliver Klein Remix) - 9:27

Dos Or Die Recordings 12" Vinyl
 "Urban Train" (Radio Edit) - 3:24
 "Flight 643" (Radio Edit) - 2:52
 "Urban Train" (Original Mix) - 8:25
 "Flight 643" (Original Mix) - 6:18

Charts

Weekly charts

Year-end charts

Official versions
 Radio Edit (2:52)
 Original Mix (9:05)
 Oliver Klein Remix (9:27)
 Jaimy & Kenny D Remix (7:38)
 Orkidea's Wintergalactic Mix (9:11)
 Richard Durand Remix (8:48)
 John Christian Original Mix (5:55)
 Laidback Luke 2010 Rework (6:00)
Fei-Fei's Feded Trap 643 (3:56)

United Kingdom tracks were edited for their release.
 Original Mix (6:29)
 Oliver Klein Remix (6:42)
 Jaimy & Kenny D Remix (6:37)

Release history

References

Tiësto songs
2001 songs
Songs written by Tiësto